Elaeomyxa is a genus of slime molds in the family Lamprodermataceae. , there are four known species in the genus. Species in this genus have been documented in North America, Eurasia, Africa, and Australasia.

Biology
The Elaeomyxa genus belongs to the true slime mold phylum Myxomycetes (also known as Mycetozoa) of fungus-like organisms that have at different times been classified in the protist, animal, and fungi kingdoms. Like other true slime molds, Elaeomyxa species have distinct life cycle phases. During the trophic stage, called the plasmodium, the slime mold ingests food in an amoebalike manner. The slime mold then transitions to the reproductive phase, in which fruiting bodies produce spores for reproduction.

Species
The Elaeomyxa genus contains the following species:
Elaeomyxa australiensis (S.L.Stephenson, G.Moreno & H.Singer) G.Moreno, H.Singer & S.L.Stephenson, 2008
Elaeomyxa cerifera (G.Lister) Hagelst., 1942
Elaeomyxa miyazakiensis (Emoto) Hagelst., 1942
Elaeomyxa reticulospora  (Gilert) G.Moreno, H.Singer & S.L.Stephenson, 2008

References

Myxogastria
Amoebozoa genera